Sara van Baalbergen (1607 – after 1638), was a Dutch Golden Age painter.

According to the Netherlands Institute for Art History (RKD) she was the first female member of the Haarlem Guild of St. Luke and was mentioned as member in the years 1631 and 1634–1638. She married the painter Barent van Eysen, who was a follower of Vincent van der Vinne, in 1634.
No known works survive.

References

1607 births
1640s deaths
Dutch Golden Age painters
Artists from Haarlem
Painters from Haarlem
Dutch women painters
17th-century women artists